Little Penck Glacier is on Mount Kilimanjaro in Tanzania, on the west slope of the peak. Once extending from the Northern Ice Field, the glacier detached from the icefield by 1992. A sizeable but stagnant ice body remains near the 1912 historical terminal end of the glacier. The now vanished Great Penck and Uhlig Glaciers once flanked Little Penck Glacier to the north and south, respectively.

See also
Retreat of glaciers since 1850
List of glaciers in Africa

References

Glaciers of Tanzania